La Bastide is a commune in the Pyrénées-Orientales department in southern France.

Geography

Localisation 
La Bastide is located in the canton of Le Canigou and in the arrondissement of Céret.

Government and politics 
Mayors

Population

See also
Communes of the Pyrénées-Orientales department

References

Communes of Pyrénées-Orientales